Nana Falgunrao Patole (born 5 June 1963) is an Indian politician who is the current President of Maharashtra Pradesh Congress Committee from 5 February 2021. He was the  Speaker of the Maharashtra Legislative Assembly before this appointment.

A former Member of the Parliament of India (the 16th Lok Sabha), he represented the BJP. He represented the Bhandara-Gondiya in Lok Sabha. In 2017, he resigned from BJP and the Lok Sabha. On 11 January 2018. he joined Congress party.

Political career 
In the 2014 Lok sabha elections, he contested the constituency as the BJP/NDA candidate and won. He defeated then Union minister Praful Patel by 149,254 votes. He was also Member of the Legislative Assembly for Sakoli from 2009 to 2014. He fights for OBC and was the leader of the opposition in the Maharashtra Legislative Assembly Patole has resigned from his Loksabha Membership by submitting his resignation letter to Loksabha Speaker Sumitra Mahajen. After then he joins indian national congress. Due to his strong attachment with farmers issues Congress party selected him as a national chairman of All India Kisan Congress.

Positions held 
 1990 : Bhandara Zilla Parishad Member from Sangadi Zilla Parishad Constituency, Bhandara district
 1999 – May 2014 : Member, State Legislative Assembly, Maharashtra (3 Terms)
 May 2014 : Elected to 16th Lok Sabha
 September 2018 : Chairman, All India Kisan Congress
 1 September 2014 onwards : Member, Standing Committee on Science & Technology, Environment & Forests
 October, 2019 : Contested election from Sakoli Maharashtra state Assembly elections from Indian National Congress party candidate and secured victory. 
 2019 : INC- NCP- Shiv Sena post election alliance as Mahavikas Aghadhi formed and he was elected as Speaker of State assembly without any contest.
 Feb, 2021 : Nana Patole appointed Maharashtra Pradesh Congress Committee president.

References

People from Bhandara
1963 births
Bharatiya Janata Party politicians from Maharashtra
Maharashtra MLAs 1999–2004
Maharashtra MLAs 2004–2009
Maharashtra MLAs 2009–2014
Living people
India MPs 2014–2019
Lok Sabha members from Maharashtra
Marathi politicians
Indian National Congress politicians from Maharashtra